Tulsi Gabbard (born April 12, 1981) is an American politician, United States Army Reserve officer and political commentator who served as the U.S. representative for Hawaii's 2nd congressional district from 2013 to 2021. Gabbard was the first Hindu member of Congress and also the first Samoan-American voting member of Congress. She was a candidate for the Democratic nomination in the 2020 United States presidential election, before leaving the party and becoming an independent in October 2022.

In 2002, Gabbard was elected to the Hawaii House of Representatives at the age of 21. Gabbard served in a field medical unit of the Hawaii Army National Guard while deployed to Iraq from 2004 to 2005 and was stationed in Kuwait from 2008 to 2009 as an Army Military Police platoon leader. While a member of Congress, she served as a vice chair of the Democratic National Committee (DNC) from 2013 to 2016, and resigned to endorse Bernie Sanders' campaign for the 2016 Democratic presidential nomination.

During her time in Congress, she frequently appeared on Fox News to criticize the Barack Obama administration for refusing to say that the real enemy of the United States is radical Islam or Islamic extremism. During her presidential campaign, she highlighted an opposition to military interventionism, although she has called herself a "hawk" on terrorism. Her decision to meet Syrian President Bashar al-Assad and her skepticism of claims that he had used chemical weapons gave rise to public disagreement from mainstream Democrats.

In March 2020, Gabbard ended her presidential candidacy to endorse Joe Biden and was succeeded by Kai Kahele in the House of Representatives on January 3, 2021. Gabbard has since taken more conservative positions on issues such as abortion, transgender rights and border security. Gabbard endorsed Florida's Parental Rights in Education Act and was a featured speaker at the 2022 Conservative Political Action Conference (CPAC). She continued her frequent presence on Fox News, including serving as a fill-in host for Tucker Carlson Tonight and eventually becoming a paid contributor to the network. In October 2022, Gabbard announced that she had left the Democratic Party altogether, citing their positions on foreign policy and social issues as the primary reasons for her departure, and as of that date is unaffiliated with any party. She followed her announcement by endorsing and campaigning for numerous Republican candidates in that year's midterm elections.

Early life and education 
Gabbard was born on April 12, 1981, in Leloaloa, Maʻopūtasi County, on American Samoa's main island of Tutuila. She was the fourth of five children born to Carol (née Porter) Gabbard and her husband, Mike Gabbard. In 1983, when Gabbard was two years old, her family moved to Hawaii, where her family had lived in the late 1970s.

Gabbard has both European and Samoan ancestry, and was raised in a multicultural household. Her mother was born in Indiana and grew up in Michigan. Her father was born in American Samoa and lived in Hawaii and Florida as a child; he is of Samoan and European ancestry.

Gabbard was raised in accordance with the teachings of the Science of Identity Foundation (SIF) religious community and its spiritual leader, Chris Butler, and was sheltered from outside influences. She has said Butler's work still guides her. In 2015, Gabbard called Butler her guru dev (roughly, "spiritual teacher"). Gabbard's husband and ex-husband have also been members of the community. Gabbard has been reluctant to speak publicly about the SIF.  Gabbard was  homeschooled through high school, except for two years at an all-girls SIF boarding school in the Philippines.  Her first name, Tulasi in Sanskrit, is the word for holy basil, which Hindus regard as an earthly manifestation of the goddess Tulasi, an avatar of Lakshmi.  Her siblings also have Sanskrit-origin names.

Gabbard embraced the Hindu faith as a teenager.

Gabbard worked for a number of organizations founded by her father, including:
 The Alliance for Traditional Marriage and Values, an anti-gay political action committee (PAC) founded to pass an amendment giving the Hawaii state legislature the power to "reserve marriage to opposite-sex couples;" she began working for the organization in 1998 and spoke on its behalf as late as 2004.
 Stand Up For America (SUFA), founded in the wake of the September 11 attacks.  
 The Healthy Hawai'i Coalition, for which she worked as an educator.

In 2002, while working as a self-employed martial arts instructor, Gabbard dropped out of Leeward Community College where she was studying television production to successfully run for election to the Hawaii House of Representatives.

In 2009, Gabbard graduated from Hawaii Pacific University with a Bachelor of Science in Business Administration with a concentration in International Business.

Military service 

In April 2003, while serving in the Hawaii State Legislature, Gabbard enlisted in the Hawaii Army National Guard.  In July 2004, she was deployed for a 12-month tour in Iraq, serving as a specialist with the Medical Company, 29th Support Battalion, 29th Infantry Brigade Combat Team. In Iraq, Gabbard served at Logistical Support Area Anaconda, completing her tour in 2005.  Because of the deployment, she chose not to campaign for reelection to the state legislature.
 
In March 2007, she graduated from the Accelerated Officer Candidate School at the Alabama Military Academy. She was commissioned as a second lieutenant, and assigned to the 29th Brigade Special Troops Battalion, 29th Infantry Brigade Combat Team of the Hawaii Army National Guard, this time to serve as an Army Military Police officer. She was stationed in Kuwait from 2008 to 2009. She was one of the first women to enter a Kuwaiti military facility, as well as the first woman to receive an award of appreciation from the Kuwait National Guard.

Gabbard is a recipient of the Combat Medical Badge and the Meritorious Service Medal. On October 12, 2015, she was promoted from the rank of captain to major at a ceremony at the National Memorial Cemetery of the Pacific. She continued to serve as a major in the Hawaii Army National Guard until her transfer to the 351st Civil Affairs Command, a California-based United States Army Reserve unit assigned to the United States Army Civil Affairs and Psychological Operations Command, in June 2020.

On August 7, 2018, the Honolulu Star-Advertiser reported that the Hawaii Army National Guard had instructed Gabbard that a video of her in uniform on her VoteTulsi Facebook page did not comply with military ethics rules. Gabbard's campaign removed the video and added a disclaimer to the website's banner image of Gabbard in uniform in a veterans' cemetery that the image does not imply an endorsement from the military. A similar situation happened during a previous Gabbard congressional campaign. A spokeswoman for Gabbard said the campaign would work closely with the Department of Defense to ensure compliance with all regulations. In October 2020, Gabbard left the Hawaii Army National Guard to join the Army Reserve with a California-based unit. On July 4, 2021, Gabbard was promoted to the rank of lieutenant colonel.

Political career

Hawaii House of Representatives (2002–2004) 

In 2002, after redistricting, Gabbard won the four-candidate Democratic primary for the 42nd district of the Hawaii House of Representatives with a plurality of 43% of the vote. Gabbard then won the general election with 60.7% of the vote, defeating Republican Alfonso Jimenez. At the age of 21, Gabbard became the youngest legislator ever elected in Hawaii's history, and was at the time the youngest woman ever elected to a U.S. state legislature.

During her term of office, Gabbard successfully led opposition to, and protests of, a state bill that would have legalized same-sex civil unions, and urged Hawaiians to support the Federal Marriage Amendment to prevent federal law from overriding state law with regard to same-sex marriage.

In 2004, Gabbard filed for reelection but then volunteered for Army National Guard service in Iraq. Rida Cabanilla, who filed to run against her, called on Gabbard to resign because she would not be able to represent her district from Iraq. Gabbard announced in August 2004 that she would not campaign for a second term, and Cabanilla won the Democratic primary with 58% of the vote. State law prevented the removal of Gabbard's name from the ballot.

Honolulu City Council (2011–2012) 

After returning home from her second deployment to the Middle East in 2009, Gabbard ran for a seat on the Honolulu City Council vacated by City Councilman Rod Tam, of the 6th district, who decided to retire to run for mayor of Honolulu. In the 10-candidate nonpartisan open primary in September 2010, Gabbard finished first with 26.8% of the vote. In the November 2 runoff election she defeated Sesnita Moepono with 49.5% of the vote.

Gabbard introduced a measure to help food truck vendors by loosening parking restrictions. She also introduced Bill 54, a measure that authorized city workers to confiscate personal belongings stored on public property with 24 hours notice to its owner. After overcoming opposition from the American Civil Liberties Union (ACLU) and Occupy Hawai'i, Bill 54 passed and became City Ordinance 1129.

United States House of Representatives (2013–2021)

2012 election and first term (113th Congress) 

In early 2011, Mazie Hirono, the incumbent Democratic U.S. Representative for Hawaii's 2nd congressional district, announced that she would run for the United States Senate. In May 2011, Gabbard announced her candidacy for Hirono's House seat. The Democratic Mayor of Honolulu, Mufi Hannemann, was the best-known candidate in the six-way primary, but Gabbard won with 62,882 votes (55%); the Honolulu Star-Advertiser called her win an "improbable rise from a distant underdog to victory." After winning the primary, Gabbard resigned from the City Council on August 16 "in order to focus on her congressional campaign" and to prevent the cost of holding a special election.

As the Democratic nominee, Gabbard spoke at the 2012 Democratic National Convention in Charlotte, North Carolina, at the invitation of House Minority Leader Nancy Pelosi, who called Gabbard "an emerging star." As expected in heavily Democratic Hawaii, she won the general election on November 6, 2012, defeating Republican Kawika Crowley by 168,503 to 40,707 votes (80.6%–19.4%), becoming the first voting Samoan-American and first Hindu member of Congress.

In December 2012, Gabbard applied to be considered for appointment to the U.S. Senate seat vacated by the death of Daniel Inouye. Despite support from some prominent mainland Democrats, she was not on the list of three candidates which the Democratic Party of Hawaii sent to the governor.

In March 2013, Gabbard introduced the Helping Heroes Fly Act, which sought to improve airport security screenings for severely wounded veterans. It passed Congress and was signed into law by President Barack Obama. She also introduced the House version of the Military Justice Improvement Act.

Second term (114th Congress) 

Gabbard was reelected on November 8, 2014, defeating Crowley again, by 142,010 to 33,630 votes (78.7%–18.6%); Libertarian candidate Joe Kent garnered 4,693 votes (2.6%).

Along with Senator Hirono, Gabbard introduced a bill to award the Congressional Gold Medal to Filipinos and Filipino American veterans who had fought in World War II. The bill passed Congress and was signed into law by President Obama in December 2016.

Gabbard also introduced Talia's Law which sought to prevent child abuse and neglect on military bases. It was passed by Congress and signed into law by President Obama in December 2016.

Third term (115th Congress) 

Gabbard was reelected on November 8, 2016, defeating Republican nominee Angela Kaaihue by 170,848 to 39,668 votes (81.2%–18.8%).

In 2017, Gabbard introduced the Off Fossil Fuels (OFF) Act, which sought to "justly transition away from fossil fuel sources of energy to 100% clean energy by 2035, and for other purposes."

In 2018, Gabbard introduced the Securing America's Election Act, a bill that would require all districts to use paper ballots, which would yield an auditable paper trail in the event of a recount. Common Cause, a nonpartisan watchdog group, endorsed the bill.

Fourth term (116th Congress) 

Gabbard was reelected in November 2018, defeating Republican nominee Brian Evans by 153,271 to 44,850 votes (77.4%–22.6%).

In September 2018, Gabbard and Representative Walter Jones (R-N.C.) co-sponsored the No More Presidential Wars Act, an effort to "reclaim the responsibility Congress has to be the body that declares war, to end these presidential wars that are being fought without the authorization of Congress."

On October 25, 2019, Gabbard announced that she would not seek reelection to the House in 2020, citing her presidential campaign. Hawaii State Senator Kai Kahele had been challenging her for the congressional seat. Kahele and the co-chair of his campaign, former Hawaii governor Neil Abercrombie, criticized her for missing votes while campaigning for president—especially the vote on Syria; however, her absences were similar to other members of Congress running for president.

In October 2020, Tulsi Gabbard and Matt Gaetz introduced a bill calling for the United States to drop criminal charges against Edward Snowden. She introduced a similar bill, with Kentucky Republican congressman Thomas Massie, aimed at ensuring the release of Julian Assange from prison in the United Kingdom where he was being held pending resolution of extradition proceedings to the United States.

Committee assignments

 Committee on Homeland Security (2013–2014)
 Subcommittee on Border and Maritime Security
 Committee on Armed Services (2013–2021)
 Subcommittee on Readiness
 Subcommittee on Emerging Threats and Capabilities
 Committee on Foreign Affairs (2013–2019)
 Subcommittee on Asia and the Pacific
 Subcommittee on the Middle East and North Africa
 Committee on Financial Services (2019–2021)
 Subcommittee on National Security, International Development and Monetary Policy
 Subcommittee on Diversity and Inclusion

Caucus membership

 Congressional Progressive Caucus
 Congressional Asian Pacific American Caucus
 Congressional NextGen 9-1-1 Caucus
 Medicare for All Caucus
 U.S.-Japan Caucus

Democratic National Committee 

On January 22, 2013, Gabbard was unanimously elected to a four-year term as a vice chair of the Democratic National Committee. In September 2015, she criticized chairwoman Debbie Wasserman Schultz's decision to hold only six debates during the 2016 Democratic Party presidential primaries, compared with 26 in 2008 and 15 in 2004, and to exclude any candidate who participated in a non-DNC sanctioned debate from all future DNC-sanctioned debates. Gabbard released a statement about the heated and public disagreements surrounding the debates in a Facebook post in 2015.

Following her public criticisms of the debate process, Gabbard was reported to have been either "disinvited" or asked to "consider not coming" to the October 13, 2015, Democratic debate in Las Vegas. In an interview with The New York Times, she spoke of an unhealthy atmosphere, saying, "no one told me I would be relinquishing my freedom of speech and checking it at the door" in taking the job. Gabbard privately wrote to Wasserman Schultz, accusing her of violating the DNC's duty of neutrality by favoring Hillary Clinton. This letter later became public in leaked emails published by WikiLeaks.

Gabbard resigned as DNC vice chair on February 28, 2016, to endorse Senator Bernie Sanders for the nomination for President of the United States. On that same day, she appeared on Meet the Press and discussed why she was stepping down. She was the first congresswoman to endorse Sanders, and later gave the nominating speech putting his name forward at the 2016 Democratic National Convention.

In July 2016, Gabbard launched a petition to end the Democratic Party's process of appointing superdelegates in the nomination process. She endorsed Keith Ellison for DNC chair in the 2017 chairmanship elections.

Gabbard was assigned as Bernie Sanders's running mate in California for any write-in votes for him. Shortly after the election, she was mentioned as a possible presidential candidate for 2020. In the 2016 United States presidential election, a Minnesota elector voted for Gabbard for vice president, but had that vote invalidated and given to Tim Kaine.

2020 presidential campaign 

In February 2019, Gabbard officially launched her 2020 presidential campaign. Gabbard was the first female combat veteran to run for president. CNN described her foreign policy platform as anti-interventionist and her economic platform as populist.

Gabbard was the most frequently Googled candidate after the first, second, and fourth 2020 Democratic debates.

Gabbard did not meet the polling threshold for the third presidential debate, prompting her to criticize the DNC's qualification criteria as not transparent. She did qualify for the fourth debate in Ohio in October 2019, but accused the media and the Democratic party of "rigging" the 2020 election, and briefly threatened to boycott the debate before deciding to participate. She skipped the LULAC Latino Town Hall to appear on Hannity's TV show, where she criticized the Democrats' impeachment process.

In July 2019, Gabbard was the only 2020 presidential candidate to visit Puerto Rico and join protests urging Governor Ricardo Rosselló to resign.

In October 2019, false and later corrected stories claimed that former Secretary of State and 2016 presidential nominee Hillary Clinton said that Russia was "grooming" a female Democrat to run as a third-party candidate, who would help President Donald Trump win reelection via a spoiler effect. The media understood Clinton to be referring to Gabbard, which Nick Merril, a Clinton spokesperson, seemed to confirm to CNN by saying: "If the nesting doll fits"; however, Gabbard repeatedly said she would not run as a third-party candidate in 2020 and did not do so. Gabbard was defended by many fellow 2020 Democratic presidential candidates, who rejected Clinton's suggestion that Gabbard was a Russian asset. Trump also defended Gabbard. Gabbard filed a defamation lawsuit against Clinton in January 2020, but dropped it five months later. To represent her in her lawsuit against Clinton, Gabbard retained two attorneys with the Los Angeles law firm Pierce Bainbridge Beck Price & Hecht and Davidoff Hutcher & Citron which, during the Mueller probe into Russian interference in the 2016 United States elections, also had represented George Papadopoulos and Rudy Giuliani.

Gabbard's presidential campaign received endorsements from David Duke and Richard B. Spencer, which she disavowed.

On March 3, 2020, Gabbard, who is of Samoan descent and 26% Southeast Asian, earned two delegates in American Samoa, making her the second woman of color (after Shirley Chisholm) and the first Asian-American and Pacific-Islander presidential candidate to earn primary delegates. She was also the only non-white Democratic party candidate to earn delegates in the 2020 election cycle.

On March 19, 2020, Gabbard dropped out of the 2020 election and endorsed former Vice President Joe Biden.

Gabbard was the only candidate with primary delegates to not be invited to the 2020 Democratic National Convention.

Post-presidential primary activities 

In May 2020, Gabbard gave her sole 2020 down-ballot endorsement to Democratic candidate Isaac Wilson, who was running for election to the 63rd district of the South Carolina House of Representatives against incumbent Republican Rep. Jay Jordan. Wilson later lost in the general election, earning 35.3% to Jordan's 64.7%.

In June 2020, Gabbard donated about $4,400 to Direct Relief and the Semper Fi & America's Fund, fundraised using proceeds from sales of excess merchandise in April and May. As Gabbard had already suspended her campaign back in March, the Federal Election Commission (FEC) sent a letter notifying that the fundraising efforts were not permitted and that her campaign ought to refund all primary election contributions made after her campaign suspension.

In July 2020, the family of Vanessa Guillén, a U.S. Army soldier and victim of military sexual harassment who was found murdered after previously being reported missing, and their attorney Natalie Khawam met with Gabbard. She later spoke at their July 1 news conference, where she said that as a fellow service member in the U.S. Army, she was "stand[ing] here for Vanessa", "for her family", and "for every service member who has experienced sexual harassment or assault and did not feel safe reporting it out of fear of retaliation".

In August 2020, Gabbard was a panelist on "Electability" during The 19th Represents Virtual Summit on the same day as Hillary Clinton but on a different panel. She spoke on the pre-recording, albeit not in the live recording made after Kamala Harris was announced as Joe Biden's running mate.

Later that same month, Gabbard and Dr. Scott Miscovich held a press conference lauding Dr. Jennifer Smith, the state's epidemiological specialist who blew the whistle regarding the Hawaii Department of Health's lack of contact tracers to deal with the COVID-19 crisis. Gabbard called for the Hawaii DOH Director Bruce Anderson and state epidemiologist Sarah Park to step down and alleged that Hawaii Governor David Ige is partly to blame. In the aftermath, Anderson retired from his position, whereas Park was later replaced and put on leave. However, Smith was also put on paid leave and Gabbard responded, saying that the action "further erodes the public trust" and that it "sends a dangerously chilling message to others in our government who are doing the right thing, that they better toe the line or they will be punished". On November 2, 2020, Smith returned to work from her paid leave. On February 1, 2021, Park left the Hawaii Department of Health.

Gabbard was a presenter at iHeartRadio Honolulu's virtual festival, Island Music Awards, and announced the winner of the "Female Artist of the Year" award.

In September 2020, Gabbard filed paperwork with the FEC to change her presidential campaign committee, Tulsi Now, into Tulsi Aloha, a leadership PAC, as well as a legal expense trust fund to pay off debts from the lawsuit against Clinton. Later that same month, she weighed into the public disagreement surrounding the Netflix film Cuties, alleging that Netflix was "complicit" in "help[ing] fuel the child sex trafficking trade".

In December 2020, Gabbard endorsed and her Tulsi Aloha PAC donated $2,800 to Nina Turner for the 2021 special election for Ohio's 11th congressional district.

Post-congressional career 

In January 2021, Gabbard launched her own podcast: This is Tulsi Gabbard. She has also made several appearances on Fox News programs since leaving Congress, such as Tucker Carlson Tonight, The Five, and The Ingraham Angle, where she criticized figures such as House Speaker Nancy Pelosi and U.S. Representative Adam Schiff, calling the latter a "domestic terrorist" for what she deemed as his attempt to "undermin[e] our constitution by trying to take away our civil liberties and rights" in the aftermath of the 2021 storming of the U.S. Capitol. 

In November 2021, she called the victory of Republican candidate Glenn Youngkin in the Virginia Gubernatorial election over Democratic candidate Terry McAuliffe a victory for all Americans. In an appearance on Hannity in April 2022 she expressed support for Florida's publicly debated Parental Rights Bill, and said that in her opinion it did not go far enough. In 2022 Gabbard spoke at the Conservative Political Action Conference, drawing criticism from Hawaii Democrats. In August 2022, Gabbard served as the fill-in host for Tucker Carlson Tonight.

Departure from the Democratic Party 
On October 11, 2022, Gabbard announced on Twitter that she was leaving the Democratic Party, accusing its leadership of "cowardly wokeness, anti-white racism, (being) hostile to people of faith and spirituality, and dragging us closer to nuclear war". Shortly thereafter, Gabbard endorsed and campaigned for several mostly unsuccessful Republican candidates in the 2022 midterm elections, several of whom say that the 2020 U.S. presidential election was stolen.  

Among the candidates she campaigned for were Senate candidates Don Bolduc, Adam Laxalt and J. D. Vance, and Arizona gubernatorial candidate Kari Lake. In November 2022, it was announced that she signed a deal with Fox News as a paid contributor after years of being a frequent guest on several of their programs.

Following Donald Trump's entry into the 2024 Republican presidential primary, commentators have suggested that Gabbard may be considered by Trump as a potential vice presidential running mate. Greg Gutfeld, the host of Gutfeld! on Fox News, predicted that Gabbard would be chosen as Trump's running mate.

Political positions 

Gabbard criticizes what she describes as a push by the "neoliberal/neoconservative war machine" for U.S. involvement in "counterproductive, wasteful foreign wars", saying they have not made the United States any safer and have started a New Cold War and nuclear arms race. She describes herself as a hawk “[w]hen it comes to the war against terrorists,” but "when it comes to counterproductive wars of regime change, I'm a dove."

Gabbard's domestic policy platform in her 2020 presidential campaign was economically and socially progressive. After the presidential campaign, she agreed with Republicans on some cultural and social issues.

Drug policy and criminal justice reform

Gabbard has been outspoken against a "broken criminal justice system" that puts "people in prison for smoking marijuana" while allowing pharmaceutical corporations responsible for "opioid-related deaths of thousands to walk away scot-free with their coffers full". Gabbard has said that as president she would "end the failed war on drugs, legalize marijuana, end cash bail, and ban private prisons". Bills she has introduced include the Ending Federal Marijuana Prohibition Act and the Marijuana Opportunity Reinvestment and Expungement (MORE) Act.

In June 2020, Gabbard introduced an amendment to the House version of the 2021 NDAA to allow members of Armed Services to use products containing CBD and other hemp derivatives. It was approved 336 to 71 as a package, although House leaders did not fight for its inclusion in the final bill.

In January 2020, in response to a question from a voter, Gabbard called for legalizing and regulating all drugs, citing Portugal's model for drug decriminalization.

Immigration 
Gabbard has expressed support for increased border security and voted with Republicans for vetting of Iraqi and Syrian refugees. Gabbard also called for halting the visa waiver program after mass numbers of Syrian immigrants entered Germany, until the threat of terrorists attacks is resolved. However Gabbard has also expressed support for an easier path to citizenship for illegal immigrants, increasing skilled immigration, and granting work visas to immigrants. She said she would be open to a proposal for a border wall if experts say it's warranted.

Environment
Gabbard protested the construction of the Dakota Access Pipeline in North Dakota in 2016.

Gabbard successfully passed an amendment to the 2019 National Defense Authorization Act that would require the Department of Energy to reexamine the safety of the Runit Dome, a leaking Cold War era nuclear waste site in the Marshall Islands. She later called for "fresh eyes" to ensure a more independent assessment of the waste site's safety.

Gabbard has spoken in favor of a Green New Deal but expressed concerns about vagueness in some proposed versions of the legislation and its inclusion of nuclear energy. She advocates her own "Off Fossil Fuels for a Better Future Act" ("OFF Act") as legislation to transition the United States to renewable energy.

Foreign affairs
On January 18, 2017, Gabbard went on a one-week "fact-finding mission" to Syria and Lebanon, during which Gabbard met various political and religious leaders from Syria and Lebanon—as well as regular citizens from both sides of the war—and also had two unplanned meetings with Syrian president Bashar al-Assad. In April 2017, Gabbard expressed skepticism about claims that Assad used chemical weapons against civilians in Khan Shaykhun, and which were followed by a military attack against Syria by the United States. Gabbard said, "a successful prosecution of Assad (at the International Criminal Court) w[ould] require collection of evidence from the scene of the incident", and that she "support[ed] the United Nations' efforts in this regard". In a 2018 interview with The Nation, Gabbard said the United States had "been waging a regime change war in Syria since 2011". After getting scrutiny for her views on Assad, Gabbard called Assad "a brutal dictator. Just like Saddam Hussein".

Gabbard criticized the Obama administration, in some of her more than 20 appearances on the Fox News network between 2013 and 2017, for "refusing" to say that the "real enemy" of the United States is "radical Islam" or "Islamic extremism."

On December 20, 2019, the Stop Arming Terrorists Act that she introduced in 2017 became law as part of National Defense Authorization Act for Fiscal Year 2020, § 1228 to prohibit the Department of Defense from "knowingly providing weapons or any other form of support to Al Qaeda" or other terrorist groups or any individual or group affiliated with any such organization.

Gabbard criticized the U.S. military's 2020 Baghdad International Airport airstrike (which killed high-level Iranian General Qasem Soleimani) as an act of war by President Trump and a violation of the U.S. Constitution, arguing that the president did not have congressional authorization for this act.

In 2017, Gabbard was blacklisted by Azerbaijan for taking part in a visit to Armenia and the disputed, breakaway region of Nagorno-Karabakh, which is populated and governed by ethnic Armenians. In October 2020, she accused Turkey, a NATO ally, of encouraging and inciting the conflict between Armenia and Azerbaijan over Nagorno-Karabakh, and co-signed a letter to Secretary of State Mike Pompeo that read: "We write to express our deep concern with Azerbaijan's renewed aggression against Artsakh (Nagorno Karabakh) and the rising possibility of a wider conflict with Armenia." Gabbard stated that the United States "must urge Azerbaijan to immediately end their attacks, and Turkey to cease its involvement both directly through the use of its armed forces, and indirectly by sending Al-Qaeda associated proxies to wipe out Nagorno-Karabakh's Armenian population—a tactic Turkey used against Syrian Kurds." Gabbard has called on the U.S. Senate and President Donald Trump to officially recognize the mass killings of Armenians in 1915 as a genocide.

In 2022, she blamed NATO and the Biden administration’s not taking the possibility of Ukraine’s joining NATO off the table for supposedly provoking the 2022 Russian invasion of Ukraine. She also argued against economic sanctions on Russia on the basis that Americans would suffer from higher oil and gas prices. Gabbard stated that “the Washington power elite” is trying to turn Ukraine into another Afghanistan.

In March 2022, she said media freedom in Russia is "not so different" from that in the United States. Politifact described her claim as false, noting that in Russia the government represses independent media and free speech, including imprisoning critics of the invasion of Ukraine.

In 2022, the Security Service of Ukraine placed Gabbard on a list of public figures whom it alleges promote Russian propaganda.

Healthcare and GMO labeling
Gabbard supports a national healthcare insurance program that covers uninsured, as well as under-insured people, and allows supplemental but not duplicative private insurance. She has since advocated for a two-tier universal health care plan that she calls "Single Payer Plus", loosely modeled after Australia's system and allowing for both supplementary and duplicative private insurance.

Gabbard has previously pushed to reinstate Medicaid eligibility for people from the Marshall Islands, Micronesia and Palau who are working and living in the United States. She has called for addressing the national nursing shortage and supports clear GMO labeling, voting in 2016 against a GMO-labeling bill she said was too weak.

First impeachment of Donald Trump 

Gabbard voted "present" when the House of Representatives voted to impeach President Trump in December 2019. In two video messages and a press release, she cited The Federalist Papers essay No. 65, and described her vote as a protest against "a political zero-sum game". Gabbard introduced H. Res. 766, which would censure Trump for several of his foreign policy decisions and "send a strong message to this president and future presidents that their abuses of power will not go unchecked, while leaving the question of removing Trump from office to the voters to decide". A week later, Gabbard said she had serious concerns that the impeachment would increase the likelihood that her party would lose the presidential election and its majority in the House of Representatives.

LGBT issues
In 1998, then-teenage Gabbard supported her father's successful campaign to amend the Constitution of Hawaii to give lawmakers the power to limit marriage to opposite-sex couples. The "Alliance for Traditional Marriage" spent more than $100,000 opposing same-sex marriage. In her campaign for the Hawaii legislature in 2002, when asked "What qualifies you to be a state representative?", Gabbard responded "Working with my father, Mike Gabbard, and others to pass a constitutional amendment to protect traditional marriage, I learned that real leaders are willing to make personal sacrifices for the common good. I will bring that attitude of public service to the legislature." CNN, in a 2019 review of Gabbard's early career, said this showed "how closely she aligned herself with her father's mission at the time".

In 2004, the then-22 year old Gabbard led a protest outside the Hawaii House Judiciary Committee objecting to the committee's decision to hold a hearing on a bill to establish legal parity between same-sex couples in civil unions and married straight couples after voters had, in 1998, approved the constitutional amendment not to support gay marriage by a margin of more than 2-to-1. In public testimony, she said: "To try to act as if there is a difference between 'civil unions' and same-sex marriage is dishonest, cowardly, and extremely disrespectful to the people of Hawaii who have already made overwhelmingly clear our position on this issue, … As Democrats, we should be representing the views of the people, not a small number of homosexual extremists."

That same year, she asserted that existing harassment figures showed Hawaii's schools were "not rampant with anti-gay harassment" and opposed a planned study that asked students about their sexuality.

In 2012, Gabbard apologized for her "anti-gay advocacy" and said she would "fight for the repeal" of the Defense of Marriage Act (DOMA). In June 2013, she was an initial cosponsor of the legislation to repeal DOMA.

Gabbard was a member of the House LGBT Equality Caucus. She received ratings of 92%, 88%, 100%, and 84% for her four congressional terms for pro-LGBT legislation from the Human Rights Campaign, a group that advocates for LGBT rights.

During a 2016 interview, while saying that her opinions on gay rights as a policy have changed, her personal views on gay people had not. After launching her presidential campaign in 2019, she apologized again and said that her views had been changed by her experience in the military "with LGBTQ service members, both here at home and while deployed". After criticism from Democrats over her past anti-gay remarks, she was defended by conservative pundit Tucker Carlson, journalist Glenn Greenwald, and openly gay representative Sean Patrick Maloney.

On December 10, 2020, Gabbard and Republican U.S. Representative Markwayne Mullin introduced a bill titled the "Protect Women's Sports Act" that would seek to define Title IX protections on the basis of an individual's biological sex, making it a violation for institutions that receive federal funding to "permit a person whose biological sex at birth is male to participate in an athletic program or activity that is designated for women or girls." If passed, this bill would effectively ban many transgender athletes from participating in programs corresponding with their gender identity. Gabbard received condemnation from LGBT organizations and activists after introducing the bill, including the Human Rights Campaign, saying: "Gabbard has lost all credibility as an ally."

On April 4, 2022, Gabbard endorsed Florida's Parental Rights Bill which forbids discussion of sexual orientation and gender identity in public school classrooms for kindergarten through third grade. Gabbard stated the bill "bans government and government schools from indoctrinating woke sexual values in our schools to a captive audience." She also suggested the bill should apply to all grades.

Personal life 
Gabbard is vegan and, as a Hindu, follows Gaudiya Vaishnavism. She describes herself as a karma yogi. She values the Bhagavad Gita as a spiritual guide and took the oath of office in 2013 using her personal copy, which she gave to Prime Minister Narendra Modi on the latter's visit to the United States in 2014.

In 2002, she married Eduardo Tamayo. They divorced in 2006, citing "the stresses war places on military spouses and families" as a reason for their divorce.

In 2015, Gabbard married freelance cinematographer and editor Abraham Williams, the son of her Honolulu office manager, in a traditional Vedic wedding ceremony.

Awards and honors 
On November 25, 2013, Gabbard received the John F. Kennedy New Frontier Award at a ceremony at the Institute of Politics at Harvard's John F. Kennedy School of Government for her efforts on behalf of veterans.

On March 20, 2014, Elle magazine honored Gabbard, with others, at the Italian Embassy in the United States during its annual "Women in Washington Power List."

On February 26, 2015, Gabbard received the National Association of Counties County Alumni Award for her "steadfast commitment to the nation's counties".

On July 15, 2015, Gabbard received the Friend of the National Parks Award from the National Parks Conservation Association.

On September 30, 2018, Gabbard received the Ho'ola Na Pua Advocacy Award for "her dedication to serving and empowering human trafficking survivors in Hawaii" at their annual Pearl Gala.

On October 16, 2018, Gabbard was honored as Hawai'i Pacific University's 2018 Paul T. C. Loo Distinguished Alumni.

Published works

See also

 List of Asian Americans and Pacific Islands Americans in the United States Congress
 Women in the United States House of Representatives
List of Hindu members of the United States Congress

References

External links
 Tulsi Gabbard on the issues – TulsiGabbard.org 
 

 Tulsi Gabbard  Video produced by Makers: Women Who Make America
 

|-

|-

|-

 
1981 births
Living people
21st-century American women politicians
American Hindus
American people of Samoan descent
American women environmentalists
American women podcasters
American podcasters
Asian-American members of the United States House of Representatives
Candidates in the 2020 United States presidential election
Conservatism in the United States
Converts to Hinduism
Democratic National Committee people
Democratic Party members of the United States House of Representatives from Hawaii
American drug policy reform activists
Female candidates for President of the United States
Female members of the United States House of Representatives
Hawaii Democrats
Hawaii Independents
Hawaii National Guard personnel
Hawaii Pacific University alumni
Honolulu City Council members
Members of the Hawaii House of Representatives
Members of the United States House of Representatives from Hawaii
National Guard (United States) officers
United States Army personnel of the Iraq War
United States congressional aides
Women city councillors in Hawaii
Women in the Iraq War
Women in the United States Army
Women state legislators in Hawaii
21st-century American politicians
Leeward Community College alumni